Rosary Church is located at 125 Chatham Road South, Tsim Sha Tsui, Kowloon, Hong Kong. It is the oldest Catholic church in Kowloon. The church is in Gothic style; the original plan was based on a Roman Basilican model. The church, St. Mary's Canossian College and St. Mary's Canossian School in adjacent belongs to same building cluster.

It was classified as Grade II Historic Building in 1990 and it has been a Grade I Historic Building since 2010.

History
In 1900, because of the Boxer Rebellion in China, some Indian battalions in the British army were stationed in Kowloon; there were about 200 Catholics in the brigade. At the same time, there was an increasing number of Catholics among the civil population.

A donation of $20,000 was made in 1903 by Dr. Anthony Gomes, a Portuguese Catholic.
so that the church could be built. The foundation stone was laid solemnly by Fr. De Maria, Pro-Vicar Apostolic of Hong Kong on 10 December 1904.

The church was designed by Palmer and Turner, and its construction church was completed in 1905, for the population of Catholic was increasing even after the British troops had left.

On 23 May 1905, the completed church was consecrated to Our Lady of Pompeii, Queen of the Most Holy Rosary; according to the intention of Dr A S Gomes, the benefactor, in loving memory of his parents and brother.

During the Second World War, the Church remained untouched by the Japanese army and still could continue its religious services. At that time, the Church was led by the Italian Parish Priest, Horace De Angelis.

References

External links

Official Homepage of Rosary Church
Webpage of the Bible Readers Association 

Tsim Sha Tsui East
Roman Catholic churches in Hong Kong
Grade I historic buildings in Hong Kong
Roman Catholic churches completed in 1905